Pavel Buran (born 25 April 1973) is a professional track cyclist from the Czech Republic. A multiple medalist at the European Championships, Buran won a bronze medal in the Keirin in 2000. As a junior, he is reputed to have done a track stand in the sprint event which lasted so long, the UCI introduced time limits for which riders were allowed to remain stationary during the event.

Palmarès

1990
2nd Sprint, UCI Track World Championships, Middlesbrough - Juniors

1991
2nd Sprint, UCI Track World Championships - Juniors
2nd Tandem, UCI Track World Championships, Stuttgart - Amateurs

1992
2nd Tandem, UCI Track World Championships, Valencia - Amateurs

1998
3rd European Track Championships, Omnium, Sprint

1999
2nd European Track Championships, Omnium, Sprint

2000
3rd, Keirin, Track World Championships, Manchester

2001
1st European Track Championships, Omnium, Sprint, Brno

2002
2nd European Track Championships, Omnium, Sprint, Buttgen
3rd Team Pursuit, European Track Championships, Buttgen

2003
3rd Sprint, European Track Championships, Omnium, Moscow
2nd Sprint, Moscow

2004
3rd Sprint, European Track Championships, Omnium, Valencia
3rd Keirin, Moscow

2005
3rd Keirin, Sydney

References

1973 births
Living people
Czech track cyclists
Czech male cyclists
Sportspeople from Brno
Cyclists at the 1996 Summer Olympics
Cyclists at the 2000 Summer Olympics
Olympic cyclists of the Czech Republic